The Kamen Riders are a group of fictional masked riding heroes in the Kamen Rider Series.

Members

Early Riders
The first 12 (or arguably, 11 since 11 and 12 are the same person) riders are of the Showa era spanning from the 70s-80s. Riders 13-15 are from the 90s. Riders 16+ are of the Heisei era in the 2000s.

Kamen Rider 1 is Takeshi Hongo, starring in Kamen Rider in 1971 and later in Kamen Rider: The First in 2005.
Kamen Rider 2 is Hayato Ichimonji, starring in Kamen Rider in 1971 and later in Kamen Rider: The First in 2005.
Kamen Rider 3 is Shiro Kazami, starring in Kamen Rider V3 in 1973 and later in Kamen Rider: The Next in 2007.
Kamen Rider 4 is Joji Yuki, co-starring in V3 as Riderman in late 1973.
Kamen Rider 5 is Keisuke Jin, starring in Kamen Rider X in 1974.
Kamen Rider 6 is Daisuke Yamamoto, starring in Kamen Rider Amazon in late 1974.
Kamen Rider 7 is Shigeru Jo, starring in Kamen Rider Stronger in 1975.
Kamen Rider 8 is Hiroshi Tsukuba, starring in Kamen Rider (Skyrider) in 1979.
Kamen Rider 9 is Kazuya Oki, starring in Kamen Rider Super-1 in 1980.
Kamen Rider 10 is Ryo Murasame, starring in the Kamen Rider ZX Manga in 1982 & the TV Special Birth of the 10th! Kamen Riders All Together!! on January 3, 1984.
Kamen Rider 11 is Kotaro Minami, starring in Kamen Rider Black as Kamen Rider Black (character) in 1987.
Kamen Rider 12 is also Kotaro Minami, starring in Kamen Rider Black RX as Kamen Rider Black RX (character) in 1988 (Later adapted as Saban's Masked Rider).
Kamen Rider 13 is Shin Kazamatsuri, starring in Shin Kamen Rider in 1992.
Kamen Rider 14 is Masaru Aso, starring in Kamen Rider ZO in 1993.
Kamen Rider 15 is Kouji Segawa, starring in Kamen Rider J in 1994.
Kamen Rider 16 is Yusuke Godai, starring in Kamen Rider Kuuga in 2000.
Kamen Rider 17 is Shouichi Tsugami, starring in Kamen Rider Agito in 2001.

Ryuki Riders
After the initial seventeen who were more exclusive Kamen Riders in their respective series, a group of thirteen riders was introduced in the February 2002 series Kamen Rider Ryuki (later adapted as Kamen Rider: Dragon Knight), bringing the total to 30:
Ren Akiyama as Kamen Rider Knight
Shinji Kido as Kamen Rider Ryuki
Masashi Sudo as Kamen Rider Scissors
Shuichi Kitaoka as Kamen Rider Zolda
Miyuki Tezuka as Kamen Rider Raia
Jun Shibaura as Kamen Rider Gai
Takeshi Asakura as Kamen Rider Ouja
Shiro Kanzaki controls Kamen Rider Odin
Satoru Tojo as Kamen Rider Tiger
Mitsuru Sano as Kamen Rider Imperer
Mirror Image Shinji Kido as Kamen Rider Ryuga, introduced in the Kamen Rider Ryuki: Episode Final film in August 2002.
Miho Kirishima as Kamen Rider Femme, was also introduced in the Ryuki: Episode Final film.
Itsuro Takamizawa as Kamen Rider Verde, introduced in the 13 Riders special in September 2002.

Faiz Riders
After Ryuki, the January 2003 series Kamen Rider 555 went back to having fewer Riders, introducing Riders 31-33:
Kamen Rider 31 is Takumi Inui who becomes Kamen Rider Faiz
Kamen Rider 32 is Masato Kusaka who becomes Kamen Rider Kaixa (briefly Keitaro Kikuchi)
Shuji Mihara is Kamen Rider Delta

The August 2003 Faiz Paradise Lost film introduced Riders 34 & 35
Yuji Kiba is Kamen Rider Orga
Orphnoch Leo is Kamen Rider Psyga

Blade Riders
The January 2004 series Kamen Rider Blade introduces four new Riders, 36-39.
Kazuma Kenzaki is Kamen Rider Blade
Sakuya Tachibana is Kamen Rider Garren
Hajime Aikawa is Kamen Rider Chalice
Mutsuki Kamijo is Kamen Rider Leangle

The September 2004 film Missing Ace introduced three new riders, 40-42:
Junichi Shimura is Kamen Rider Glaive
Shin Magaki is Kamen Rider Lance
Natsumi Miwa is Kamen Rider Larc

Hibiki Riders
The January 2005 TV series Kamen Rider Hibiki introduces six Riders (43-48) known as the "Oni" who work in conjunction with the Takeshi organization:
Hitoshi Hidaka is Kamen Rider Hibiki (character)
Iori Izumi is Kamen Rider Ibuki
Zaoumaru Zaitsuhara is Kamen Rider Zanki
Tomizo Todayama is Kamen Rider Todoroki
Akira Amami is Kamen Rider Amaki
? is Kamen Rider Shuki

The September 2005 film Seven Senki introduces 5 more Riders (49-53) whose human identities are unidentified:
Kamen Rider Kabuki
Kamen Rider Touki
Kamen Rider Kirameki
Kamen Rider Nishiki
Kamen Rider Habataki

Kabuto Riders
The January 2006 series Kamen Rider Kabuto introduced a "Zector" group of eight more Riders (54-61):
Souji Kusakabe is Kamen Rider Dark Kabuto
Daisuke Kazama is Kamen Rider Drake
Arata Kagami is Kamen Rider Gatack
Souji Tendou is Kamen Rider Kabuto (character)
Sou Yaguruma is Kamen Rider KickHopper
Tsurugi Kamishiro is Kamen Rider Sasword
Sou Yaguruma is Kamen Rider TheBee
Shun Kageyama, who took over as TheBee, later also became Kamen Rider PunchHopper

Den-O Riders
The January 2007 series Kamen Rider Den-O and its expansive Cho-Den-O Series universe introduced 7 more Riders (62-68):
Ryotaro Nogami is Kamen Rider Den-O (character)
Yuto Sakurai is Kamen Rider Zeronos
"Gaoh" as Kamen Rider Gaoh in Kamen Rider Den-O: I'm Born! in August 2007
"Kotaro" is Kamen Rider Mini Den-O also in I'm Born!
Kotaro Nogami is Kamen Rider New Den-O introduced in Saraba Kamen Rider in October 2008
"Shiro" is Kamen Rider Yuuki, also in Saraba
Reiji Kurosaki is Kamen Rider G Den-O in the 2010 trilogy Cho-Den-O

Kiva Riders
The January 2008 series Kamen Rider Kiva introduces 5 new Riders (69-73):
Wataru Kurenai as Kamen Rider Kiva (character)
Keisuke Nago as Kamen Rider Ixa
Taiga Nobori as Kamen Rider Saga
"King" as Kamen Rider Dark Kiva
Masao Kurenai as Kamen Rider New Kiva

In April 2008 the Climax Deka crossover between Den-O and Kiva introduces Negataros as Kamen Rider Nega Den-O, the 74th Rider, while the August 2008 Kiva-exclusive film King of the Castle in the Demon World introduced 2 more Riders (75 and 76):
Takato Shiramine as Kamen Rider Rey
Takashi Sugimura as Kamen Rider Arc

Decade Riders
The tenth Heisei series beginning January 2009, Kamen Rider Decade, introduced 7 new Riders (77-83):
Tsukasa Kadoya as Kamen Rider Decade (character)
Yusuke Onodera as Kamen Rider Kuuga
"Kamata" as Kamen Rider Abyss
Daiki Kaito is Kamen Rider Diend
"Akira" as Kamen Rider Amaki
"Chinomanako" as Chinomanako Diend or Kamen Rider Chinomanako
Natsumi Hikari as Kamen Rider Kivala

Double Riders
The September 2009 series Kamen Rider W introduces another 7 new Riders (84-90): 
Shotaro Hidari as Kamen Rider Joker
"Philip" as Kamen Rider Cyclone
Kamen Rider Double (character) is formed by the merger of Shotaro and Philip and exhibits Cyclone and Joker halves
Sokichi Narumi as Kamen Rider Skull
Ryu Terui as Kamen Rider Accel
Katsumi Daido as Kamen Rider Eternal

OOO Riders
The September 2010 series Kamen Rider OOO introduced another 3 new Riders (91-93):
Eiji Hino as Kamen Rider OOO (character)
Shintaro Goto as Kamen Rider Birth
Akira Date as Kamen Rider Birth Prototype (former user of Birth)

Fourze Riders
The September 2011 series Kamen Rider Fourze introduced another 2 Riders (94 & 95):
Gentaro Kisaragi as Kamen Rider Fourze (character)
Ryusei Sakuta as Kamen Rider Meteor

The December 2011 film Mega Max (a crossover between OOO and Fourze) introduces 3 more Riders (96-98):
Michal Minato as Kamen Rider Aqua
The Kamen Rider Poseidon entity is formed from cells that possess Michal
Nadeshiko Misaki as Kamen Rider Nadeshiko

Wizard Riders
The September 2012 series Kamen Rider Wizard introduces 7 more Riders (99-105)
Haruto Soma as Kamen Rider Wizard
Kosuke Nito as Kamen Rider Beast
Sou Fueki as Kamen Rider White Wizard
Mayu Inamori as Kamen Rider Mage
Minister Auma as Kamen Rider Sorcerer
Yuzuru Iijima as Kamen Rider Blue Mage
Masahiro Yamamoto as Kamen Rider Green Mage

Gaim Riders
The October 2013 series Kamen Rider Gaim has so far introduced 8 Riders (106-113)
Kouta Kazuraba as Kamen Rider Gaim (character)
Mitsuzane Kureshima as Kamen Rider Ryugen
Kaito Kumon as Kamen Rider Baron
Ryoji Hase as Kamen Rider Kurokage
Hideyasu Jonouchi as Kamen Rider Gridon
Oren Pierre Alfonzo as Kamen Rider Bravo
Takatora Kureshima as Kamen Rider Zangetsu
Yoko Minato as Kamen Rider Marika

The December 2013 film Sengoku Movie Battle introduced 14 alternate incarnations of some of the preceding Heisei era Kamen Riders (114-127) known as Bujin:
Kamen Rider Bujin Kuuga
Kamen Rider Bujin Agito
Kamen Rider Bujin Ryuki
Kamen Rider Bujin Faiz
Kamen Rider Bujin Blade
Kamen Rider Bujin Hibiki
Kamen Rider Bujin Kabuto
Kamen Rider Bujin Den-O
Kamen Rider Bujin Kiva
Kamen Rider Bujin Decade
Kamen Rider Bujin Double
Kamen Rider Bujin OOO
Kamen Rider Bujin Fourze
Kamen Rider Bujin Wizard

Kamen Rider Bujin Gaim who consumes them all, is the 128th Kamen Rider.

Female riders
The majority of Kamen Riders have been male. Some of the female Riders include but are not limited to:
Kamen Rider Femme from Kamen Rider Ryuki, 02 & 03
Kamen Rider Larc from Kamen Rider Blade, 04 & 05
Kamen Rider Shuki from Kamen Rider Hibiki, 05 & 06
Kamen Rider Kivala from Kamen Rider Decade, 2009
Kamen Rider Nadeshiko from Mega Max, 2011
Kamen Rider Marika from Kamen Rider Gaim, 2013

See also
Birth of the 10th! Kamen Riders All Together!!, a crossover between the first ten in 1984
Kamen Rider Girls
Kamen Rider World, a crossover between ZO and J (14th and 15th) to battle monsters from all of the series in 1994
Kamen Rider × Kamen Rider OOO & W Featuring Skull: Movie War Core, a 2010 crossover